, or MMC, is a Japanese company. It is a manufacturer of cement products, copper and aluminum products, cemented carbide tools, and electronic materials. It is one of the core companies of Mitsubishi Group.

The company is listed on the Tokyo Stock Exchange and the Osaka Securities Exchange, and is a constituent of the Nikkei 225 stock market index.

In 2018 Mitsubishi Materials admitted that five of its subsidiaries, Mitsubishi Cable Industries Ltd., Mitsubishi Shindoh Co., Mitsubishi Aluminum Co., Tachibana Metal MFG Co. and Diamet Corp., had falsified quality data over the past three years on shipments including aluminium and automotive components. Mitsubishi Materials has started investigations at about 120 factories in its group.

Business summary
Mitsubishi Materials Corporation has eight business sections, which are:

 Cement business
 Portland cement
 Cement-related products
 Ready-mix concrete
 Building materials
 Metals business
 Copper smelting
 Copper and copper alloy products
 Advanced materials & tools business
 Cemented carbide products
 Sintered parts
 High-performance alloy products
 Energy business
 Fossil fuels
 Nuclear energy-related services
 Electronic materials & components business
 Electronic materials
 Electronic components
 Polycrystalline silicon
 Chemicals
 Recycling business
 Resource-, environment-, and recycling-related products
 Aluminum business
 Aluminum beverage cans
 Rolled and extruded aluminum products
 Processed aluminum products
 Precious metals business

References

External links

 Company website 

Cement companies of Japan
Manufacturing companies based in Tokyo
Mitsubishi companies
Companies listed on the Tokyo Stock Exchange
Companies listed on the Osaka Exchange
Japanese companies established in 1871